The Rees ministry was the 91st ministry of the Government of New South Wales, and was led by the 41st Premier Nathan Rees.

The Rees Labor ministry was formed following the resignation of Premier Morris Iemma on 5 September 2008 and the unanimous election of Rees as Leader of the Labor caucus and Carmel Tebbutt as Deputy Leader.

On 5 September Rees and Tebbutt were sworn as Premier and Deputy Premier respectively by the Governor of New South Wales Professor Marie Bashir AC. Therest of the ministry ministry was sworn in on 8 September 2008 at Government House by the Lieutenant Governor, James Spigelman AC.

Composition of ministry
This ministry was announced on 8 September 2008. Just three days later Matt Brown resigned, causing a minor reshuffle. Tony Stewart was dismissed on 11 November 2008. There was a minor rearrangement in January 2009. John Della Bosca resigned from the ministry on 31 August 2009, prompting a reshuffle in which Rees punished those who had plotted against him as leader. In November 2009 the Labor state conference gave Rees the power to choose his own cabinet and he responded by sacking Joe Tripodi and Ian Macdonald. 17 days later a Labor caucus revolt saw Kristina Keneally succeeded Rees as Premier.

 
Ministers are members of the Legislative Assembly unless otherwise noted.

See also

Members of the New South Wales Legislative Assembly, 2007-2011
Members of the New South Wales Legislative Council, 2007-2011

Notes

References

 

! colspan=3 style="border-top: 5px solid #cccccc" | New South Wales government ministries

New South Wales ministries
2008 establishments in Australia
2009 disestablishments in Australia
Australian Labor Party ministries in New South Wales